Puerto Rico Senatorial District VIII, also known as the Senatorial District of Carolina, is one of the eight senatorial districts of Puerto Rico. It is currently represented by Henry Neumann and Nitza Morán (both from the New Progressive Party).

District profile

The Senatorial District VIII has an approximate population of 465,427. It covers the following municipalities:
 Canóvanas
 Carolina
 Ceiba
 Culebra
 Fajardo
 Loíza
 Luquillo
 Río Grande
 Trujillo Alto
 Vieques

In previous distributions, the territory covered by the Senatorial District VIII has changed. In 1983, the District didn't include the municipality of Ceiba and included the Sabana Llana region of San Juan. In the 1991 redistribution, Ceiba was reassigned to the District of Guayama, while the Sabana Llana region was reassigned to the District of San Juan.

The district hasn't suffered changes in the recent redistributions of 2002 and 2011.

Election results

2012

|-
! style="background-color:#FF0000" |
| style="width: 130px" | Popular Democratic Party (PPD)
|               | Pedro A. Rodríguez
| 101,391
| 25.53
| 
|-
! style="background-color:#FF0000" |
| style="width: 130px" | Popular Democratic Party (PPD)
|               | Luis Daniel Rivera
| 100,080
| 25.20
| 
|-
! style="background-color:#0080FF" |
| style="width: 130px" | New Progressive Party (PNP)
|               | Lornna Soto
| 91,216
| 22.97
| -1.88
|-
! style="background-color:#0080FF" |
| style="width: 130px" | New Progressive Party (PNP)
|               | Roger Iglesias
| 86,584
| 21.80
| -1.10
|-
! style="background-color:#01DF3A" |
| style="width: 130px" | Puerto Rican Independence Party (PIP)
|               | Pedro José "Pepe" Alvarez
| 5,378
| 1.35
| -1.75
|-
! style="background-color:#01DF3A" |
| style="width: 130px" | Puerto Rican Independence Party (PIP)
|               | Dwight Rodríguez Orta
| 5,302
| 1.34
| +0.36
|-
! style="background-color:#008080" |
| style="width: 130px" | Movimiento Unión Soberanista (MUS)
|               | Guillermo Sosa Rodríguez
| 2,217
| 0.56
| 
|-
! style="background-color:#FFBF00" |
| style="width: 130px" | Puerto Ricans for Puerto Rico Party (PPR)
|               | Fabiola Carrasquillo
| 1,309
| 0.33
| -1.46
|-
! style="background-color:#FFBF00" |
| style="width: 130px" | Puerto Ricans for Puerto Rico Party (PPR)
|               | Edwin M. González
| 1,134
| 0.29
|

2008

|-
! style="background-color:#0080FF" |
| style="width: 130px" | New Progressive Party (PNP)
|               | Lornna Soto
| 105,008
| 24.85%
| +0.19
|-
! style="background-color:#0080FF" |
| style="width: 130px" | New Progressive Party (PNP)
|               | Héctor Martínez
| 103,824
| 24.57
| +0.23
|-
! style="background-color:#FF0000" |
| style="width: 130px" | Popular Democratic Party (PPD)
|               | Javier Aponte Dalmau
| 95,038
| 22.49
| 
|-
! style="background-color:#FF0000" |
| style="width: 130px" | Popular Democratic Party (PPD)
|               | Nazario Lugo
| 93,398
| 22.10
| 
|-
! style="background-color:#FFBF00" |
| style="width: 130px" | Puerto Ricans for Puerto Rico Party (PPR)
|               | Fabiola Carrasquillo
| 7,585
| 1.79
| 
|-
! style="background-color:#FFBF00" |
| style="width: 130px" | Puerto Ricans for Puerto Rico Party (PPR)
|               | Brian P. Deese
| 7,094
| 1.68
| 
|-
! style="background-color:#01DF3A" |
| style="width: 130px" | Puerto Rican Independence Party (PIP)
|               | Dwight Rodríguez Orta
| 4,158
| 0.98
| -2.02
|-
! style="background-color:#01DF3A" |
| style="width: 130px" | Puerto Rican Independence Party (PIP)
|               | Juan J. Rivera
| 4,025
| 0.95
|

2004

|-
! style="background-color:#0080FF" |
| style="width: 130px" | New Progressive Party (PNP)
|               | Lornna Soto
| 106,272
| 24.66%
| 
|-
! style="background-color:#0080FF" |
| style="width: 130px" | New Progressive Party (PNP)
|               | Héctor Martínez
| 104,905
| 24.34
| 
|-
! style="background-color:#FF0000" |
| style="width: 130px" | Popular Democratic Party (PPD)
|               | Yasmín Mejías
| 100,581
| 23.34
| -0.76
|-
! style="background-color:#FF0000" |
| style="width: 130px" | Popular Democratic Party (PPD)
|               | Juan Cancel Alegría
| 96,537
| 22.40
| -1.10
|-
! style="background-color:#01DF3A" |
| style="width: 130px" | Puerto Rican Independence Party (PIP)
|               | Carmen Texeira
| 8,989
| 2.09
| 
|-
! style="background-color:#01DF3A" |
| style="width: 130px" | Puerto Rican Independence Party (PIP)
|               | Paco Abreu
| 8,666
| 2.01
| 
|-
! style="background-color:#999999" |
| style="width: 130px" | Independent
|               | Ebenecer López Ruyol
| 2,936
| 0.68
|

References

External links
Distribución de Distritos Senatoriales de Puerto Rico

Puerto Rico Senatorial districts